For Truth (Za pravdu) was a national-conservative political party in Russia. It was established in February 2020 by writer Zakhar Prilepin. On January 28, 2021, the party united with the Patriots of Russia party and A Just Russia.

History
The creation of the movement "For truth" was announced on 29 October 2019 at a press conference by Zakhar Prilepin, Alexander Kazakov, Vadim Samoilov, Eduard Boyakov and Vladislav Bevza.

The party has called for Russia's annexation of eastern Ukrainian territories as well as the breakaway Georgian regions of Abkhazia and South Ossetia.

On 30 November 2019, Prilepin confirmed a plan to transform the movement into a political party to participate in the elections.

On 1 February 2020, the founding congress of the party was held. At the congress, Zakhar Prilepin was elected party leader.

On 19 May 2020, the Ministry of Justice added party to the list of parties that can participate in the elections.

The party participated in the 2020 regional elections in five regions. In the Ryazan region, the party received 7% of the vote, winning 2 seats in the regional parliament, and gaining free access to federal parliamentary elections. In other regions, the party received less than 5% of the votes without passing the electoral barrier.

Notable members
Zakhar Prilepin, writer;
Alexander Babakov, Senator from Tambov Oblast;
Steven Seagal, actor;
Nikolai Starikov, writer.

References

External links

2020 establishments in Russia
2021 disestablishments in Russia
A Just Russia
Conservative parties in Russia
Defunct nationalist parties in Russia
Eurosceptic parties in Russia
Formerly registered political parties in Russia
Political parties disestablished in 2021
Political parties established in 2020
Social conservative parties